Events from the year 1707 in Spain.

Incumbents
Monarch: Philip V

Events
April 25 - Battle of Almansa: the Bourbon army of Spain and France (with Irish mercenaries) under the French-born Englishman James FitzJames, 1st Duke of Berwick, soundly defeats the allied forces of Portugal, England, and the Dutch Republic led by the French-born Huguenot in English service Henri de Massue, Earl of Galway. Following this, Philip V of Spain promulgates the first Nueva Planta decrees, bringing the Kingdoms of Valencia and Aragon under the laws of the Crown of Castile.

Births
May 21 - Francisco Salzillo, sculptor (d. 1783)
August 25 - Louis I of Spain (d. 1724)

Deaths

See also
War of the Spanish Succession

References

 
Years of the 18th century in Spain